Utrpení mladého Boháčka is a Czech comedy film written by Eduard Verner and directed by František Filip. It was released in 1969.

Plot
Thirty-year-old Tonda Boháček works as a tractor driver in Čečelice. He lives with his mother, who constantly urges him to find a girl, and one day even posts a classified ad on his behalf. From the responses he gets, Mrs. Boháček selects Jana, and pressures her son to go meet her in the neighbouring town of Úvaly. Tonda goes off, and on the way, he stops at a coffeehouse. In his reluctance to change his lifestyle and get married, he decides to write a letter, ostensibly from Jana herself, indicating she does not wish to see him a second time. Still at the coffeehouse, he meets a bunch of travellers, one of whom is Květa Lesecká. Tonda leaves the bar and heads off to meet Jana. The encounter is awkward and ends in mutual embarrassment, and Tonda returns home. On the way, he picks up a hitchhiker, who is none other than Květa Lesecká from the bar. Remembering that he had promised his mother to bring Jana home for supper, he invites Květa to join him instead. Tonda quickly falls for the young lady, whom he finds down-to-earth and easy to talk to, despite his natural timidness.

Cast and characters
 Pavel Landovský as Tonda Boháček
 Stella Zázvorková as Mother
 Regina Rázlová as Květa Lesecká
 Jorga Kotrbová as Jana Pazderková
 Jaroslav Satoranský as Petr Stárek

References

External links
 

1969 films
Czechoslovak comedy films
1969 comedy films
Czech comedy films
1960s Czech films